Bernadette M. Sanchez (born May 20, 1953) is an American politician and a Democratic former member of the New Mexico Senate, representing the 26th District since 2001. She did not seek re-election in 2012 and was succeeded by Democrat Jacob Candelaria in 2013.

References

External links 
 Senator Bernadette M. Sanchez - (D) at New Mexico Legislature
 Bernadette Sanchez - Biography at Project Vote Smart
 Follow the Money – Bernadette M Sanchez
 2008 2006 2004 2002 2000 campaign contributions

1953 births
Hispanic and Latino American state legislators in New Mexico
Hispanic and Latino American women in politics
Living people
Democratic Party New Mexico state senators
Women state legislators in New Mexico
Politicians from Albuquerque, New Mexico
21st-century American women